Kiss My Axe is an album by jazz guitarist Al Di Meola that was released in 1991. It is a jazz fusion album, with significant world music influences. Like its predecessor, Tirami Su (1987), it is credited to "The Al Di Meola Project", although the two albums have an almost entirely different set of backing musicians.

The album's title is a play on words on the phrase "kiss my ass", with "axe" as a common nickname for an electric guitar. Di Meola chose the title in part because of his frustration with the music industry of the time, which he felt rewarded "elevator muzak" over more adventurous music.

Track listing 
All songs by Al Di Meola unless otherwise noted.
 "South Bound Traveler" (Barry Miles) – 5:22
 "The Embrace" – 5:49
 "Kiss My Axe"  – 5:04
 "Morocco" – 7:41
 "Gigi's Playtime Rhyme (Interlude #1)" – 2:36
 "One Night Last June" – 8:19
 "Phantom" (Chick Corea, arranged by Al Di Meola) 7:53
 "Erotic Interlude (Interlude #2)"  – 2:32
 "Global Safari"  – 5:42
 "Interlude #3" – 1:59
 "Purple Orchids" – 6:45
 "The Prophet (Interlude #4)" – 1:16
 "Oriana (September 24, 1988)" – 5:19

Personnel
 Al Di Meola – guitars, keyboards, percussion
 Barry Miles – keyboards 
 Rachel Z – synthesizers
 Anthony Jackson – electric contrabass guitar 
 Tony Scherr – double bass, bass guitar
 Omar Hakim – drums
 Richie Morales – drums
 Gumbi Ortiz – congas, bata, percussion
 Arto Tunçboyacıyan – bongos, percussion, voice

Chart performance

References

Al Di Meola albums
1991 albums
Tomato Records albums